Gymnastics events were competed at the 1986 South American Games in Santiago, Chile.

Medal summary

Medal table

Artistic gymnastics

Men

Women

References 

South American Games
1986 South American Games
1986 South American Games